Morris G. Hallock (February 17, 1926 – August 11, 2018) was an American politician from the state of South Dakota. He was a member of the South Dakota House of Representatives briefly in the 1950s and 1960s. Hallock has a high school education and was a newspaper publisher. He also served in the United States Navy. In the 1950s, Hallock also served as Secretary of Finance in the South Dakota Government.

References

1926 births
2018 deaths
South Dakota Republicans
People from Keya Paha County, Nebraska
People from Sturgis, South Dakota